CHLN may refer to:

 CKOB-FM, a radio station (106.9 FM) licensed to Trois-Rivieres, Quebec, Canada, which formerly held the call sign CHLN-FM
 China Housing and Land Development Inc. (NASDAQ symbol CHLN)